Robert Wilkinson may refer to:

Robert "Monty" Wilkinson, acting U.S. attorney general in 2021
Robert Wylkynson (c. 1450/1 – 1515 or later), English composer
Robert Wilkinson, an adult on the list of colonists at Roanoke Colony
Robert Wilkinson (cartographer), 18th-century English mapmaker
Robert M. Wilkinson (1921–2010), American politician, Los Angeles councilman
Robert Wilkinson (probate judge), probate judge, founding member of Phi Alpha Literary Society
Robert Wilkinson (English cricketer) (1811–1888), English cricketer
Robert Wilkinson (Australian cricketer), Australian cricketer
Robert Wilkinson (Australian politician) (1838–1928), New South Wales politician and businessman
Robert Wilkinson (footballer) (born 1956), Australian rules footballer
Robert Wilkinson (Canadian politician) (1888–1967), Canadian politician in the Legislative Assembly of British Columbia
Robert Stark Wilkinson (1844–1934), British architect
Bob Wilkinson, (1927–2016), American football end
Bob Wilkinson (cricketer), 1939–2020, English cricketer